Grouchy (or de Grouchy) is a French surname.
 Johannes de Grocheio (Johannes de Grocheio) (c. 1255 – c. 1320),  French musical theorist
 Jean de Grouchy (1354 - 1435), knight at the time of the Hundred Years' War
 Sophie de Condorcet (Sophie de Condorcet) (1764 - 1822), born Marie-Louise-Sophie de Grouchy, French writer and wife of Nicolas de Condorcet  
 Emmanuel de Grouchy (1768-1847), soldier and Marshal of France

Surnames of French origin